Cocksherd Wood is a   Local Nature Reserve in Slough in Berkshire. It is owned by Slough Borough Council and managed by Evergreen 2000. The reserve is known locally as Bluebell Wood.

Geography and site

The site features ancient woodland with coppiced areas and some meadow and grassland areas.

The site lies at the end of a Chalk dry valley, a tributary of the Haymill Valley and is mainly on the Lambeth Group. in 1979 the woods and surrounding land was transferred over to Slough Borough Council.

History

The woods have been there since at least the 1700s as they featured on Jefferys Map of Buckinghamshire which was dated 1766–68. In the 1950s the woodland was bought by the London County Council as part of the Britwell development.

In 1996 the site was declared as a local nature reserve by Slough Borough Council. In 2001 management of the reserve was given to Evergreen 2000 trust.

Fauna

The site has the following fauna:

Invertebrates

Small skipper
Small tortoiseshell
Meadow brown
Stag beetle
Pieris brassicae
Ringlet

Birds

European green woodpecker
Eurasian bullfinch
Red kite

Flora

The site has the following flora:

Trees

Acer campestre
Betula pendula
Corylus avellana
Crataegus monogyna
Quercus robur
Fagus sylvatica
Fraxinus excelsior
Ilex aquifolium
Prunus avium
Prunus spinosa
Rhododendron ponticum
Salix caprea
Sambucus nigra
Sorbus aucuparia
Ulmus procera

Plants

Lonicera periclymenum 
Anemone nemorosa
Carex sylvatica
Hyacinthoides non-scripta
Poa nemoralis
Vicia sepium

References

Local Nature Reserves in Berkshire